Throughout his career, American filmmaker, writer, and actor Woody Allen has received a considerable number of awards and distinctions in film festivals and yearly national film awards ceremonies, saluting his work as a director, screenwriter, and actor. Among his many competitive awards, he has won four Academy Awards, ten BAFTA awards, and two Golden Globe Awards.

Allen has won three Oscars for Best Original Screenplay for Annie Hall (1977), Hannah and Her Sisters (1986), and Midnight in Paris (2011), and one for Best Director for Annie Hall. He has been nominated 24 times: 16 as a screenwriter, seven as a director, and once as an actor. Allen has more screenwriting Academy Award nominations than any other writer; all in the Best Original Screenplay category. He also holds the record as the oldest winner (at age 76) of the Academy Award for Best Original Screenplay (Midnight in Paris, 2011). As a writer, Allen won the 1978 O. Henry Award for his short story The Kugelmass Episode, published in The New Yorker on May 2, 1977.

Despite friendly recognition from the Academy, Allen has consistently refused to attend the ceremony or acknowledge his Oscar wins. His publicly given reason is his standing engagement to play clarinet in a Monday night ensemble. Back in 1974, Woody was quoted by ABC News as saying, "The whole concept of awards is silly. I cannot abide by the judgment of other people, because if you accept it when they say you deserve an award, then you have to accept it when they say you don't". He broke this pattern once. At the Academy Awards ceremony in 2002, Allen made an unannounced appearance, pleading for producers to continue filming their movies in New York City after the September 11 attacks, where he stated, "I didn't have to present anything. I didn't have to accept anything. I just had to talk about New York City." He was given a standing ovation before introducing a montage of movie clips featuring New York.

His work has been widely celebrated in Europe. Allen twice won the César Award for Best Foreign Film, the first in 1980, for Manhattan and the second in 1986, for The Purple Rose of Cairo. Seven other of his movies were nominated for the prize: Annie Hall, Hannah and Her Sisters, Alice, Husbands and Wives, Manhattan Murder Mystery, Everyone Says I Love You, and Match Point. In 2002, Allen won the Prince of Asturias Award. Subsequently, the city of Oviedo, Spain, erected a life-size statue of Allen. In a 2005 UK poll The Comedian's Comedian, Allen was voted the third greatest comedy act ever by fellow comedians and comedy insiders. In June 2007, Allen received a PhD Honoris Causa from Pompeu Fabra University in Barcelona, Spain.

His honorary awards include a Career Golden Lion at the Venice Film Festival in 1995, the Lifetime Achievement Award from the Directors Guild of America in 1996, the BAFTA Fellowship in 1997, the Honorary Palme d'Or at the Cannes Festival in 2002, and the Golden Globe Cecil B. DeMille Award in 2014.

Major associations

Academy Awards

Best Director

Best Original Screenplay
{|class="wikitable"
! Year
! Film
! Result
|-
| 1978
| Annie Hall
| 
|-
| 1979
| Interiors
| 
|-
| 1980
| Manhattan
| 
|-
| 1985
| Broadway Danny Rose
| 
|-
| 1986
| The Purple Rose of Cairo
| 
|-
| 1987
| Hannah and Her Sisters| 
|-
| 1988
| Radio Days| 
|-
| 1990
| Crimes and Misdemeanors| 
|-
| 1991
| Alice| 
|-
| 1993
| Husbands and Wives| 
|-
| 1995
| Bullets over Broadway| 
|-
| 1996
| Mighty Aphrodite| 
|-
| 1998
| Deconstructing Harry| 
|-
| 2006
| Match Point| 
|-
| 2012
| Midnight in Paris| 
|-
| 2014
| Blue Jasmine| 
|-
|}

 I Shared with Marshall Brickman.
 II Shared with Douglas McGrath.

Best Actor in a Leading Role

Tony Awards

Grammy Awards

 Primetime Emmy Awards 

British Academy Film Awards
Woody Allen has received 24 BAFTA Film nominations, winning 10. In addition, he has received the British Academy's most prestigious honorary award, the Fellowship. The 1978 best film BAFTA win for Annie Hall'' went to Charles H. Joffe and Jack Rollins, as the category that year only credited the producers. In 1980, the best film category credited only the director. From 1985 to 1998, both the director and producers were credited.

Best Film

Best Direction

Best Screenplay

Best Original Screenplay

 I Shared with Marshall Brickman.
 II Shared with Robert Greenhut.
 III Shared with Douglas McGrath.

Best Actor in a Leading Role

BAFTA Fellowship

Golden Globe Awards

In 2014, Woody Allen was chosen by the Hollywood Foreign Press to receive the Cecil B. DeMille Award for his contributions to the industry. Emma Stone presented a film montage of his work, and Diane Keaton received the award on behalf of Allen who famously never shows up to Award shows.

Best Director

Best Screenplay

 I Shared with Marshall Brickman.
 II Shared with Robert Greenhut.

Best Actor – Musical or Comedy

Cecil B. DeMille Award

Directors Guild of America Awards

Writers Guild of America Awards

Film Festival Awards

Cannes Film Festival

Berlin International Film Festival

Venice International Film Festival

Miscellaneous Awards

American Comedy Awards

Saturn Awards

 II Shared with Robert Greenhut.

References
General

  (For awards and nominations)

Specific

Lists of awards received by American actor
Lists of awards received by film director
Woody Allen